Live 93 is a live album released in 1993 by The Orb on Island Records. Live 93 is a collection of highlights from The Orb's 1993 performances in Europe and Asia.  It features The Orb's live performance crew of Alex Paterson, Kris Weston, producers Nick Burton and Simon Phillips, as well as audio engineer Andy Hughes, who had stepped in when Weston decided to stop touring.  The album cover of a sheep over a power station is a parody of the cover of Pink Floyd's Animals, an album cover they had previously parodied on the cover of Aubrey Mixes: The Ultraworld Excursions.  The album reached #23 on the UK Album Chart.

Track listing
Island – 5300703:

References

External links

The Orb albums
1993 live albums
Island Records live albums
Ambient house albums